Télégone (Telegonus) is an opera by the French composer Louis Lacoste, first performed at the Académie Royale de Musique (the Paris Opera) on 6 November 1725. It takes the form of a tragédie en musique in a prologue and five acts. The libretto, by Simon-Joseph Pellegrin, is based on the Greek myth of Telegonus.

Sources
 Libretto at "Livrets baroques"
 Félix Clément and Pierre Larousse Dictionnaire des Opéras, Paris, 1881, page 530

French-language operas
Tragédies en musique
Operas by Louis Lacoste
Operas
1725 operas